Bam Khatoon Women's Football Club (Bashgah-e Futbal-e Zenan-e Xatun Bem) formerly Shahrdari Bam, is an Iranian women's football club based in Bam which plays in the Kowsar Women Football League and the AFC Women's Club Championship.

The Club is the most titled team of the Iranian Women Football league, having won nine championships.

History 

Bam Khatoon F.C. was founded in 1980 and is based in Bam, Kerman Province, Iran. In May 2021 the club announced that they would take over Shahrdari Bam and rebranded the club into Bam Khatoon F.C. regarding the agreement with the municipality of Bam.

Championship celebration 
Bam Khatoon Women's F.C. held the most crowded championship celebration in women's sports history in Iran, hosting around 30000 spectators in Bam in June 2022.

Honors 

 Iran Women Football League
Winners (8): 2011–12, 2012–13, 2013–14, 2014–15, 2017–18, 2018–19, 2019–20, 2021–22
Runners-up (2): 2016–17, 2020–21

Players

Current squad

International friendly matches 
Bam Khatoon Women's F.C. is the only and first ever Iranian women's football team that held an International camp overseas. They lost against Tomiris Touran (Kazakhstan Women's Football Championship runner-up) and a 1-0 victory against BIIK Shymkent, Kazakhstan's champion in August 2022.

AFC Women's club championship 
Bam Khatoon Women's F.C, is the first Iranian women's football team that held International friendly matches abroad and participated in the AFC Women's Club Championship 2022 West Region in Uzbekistan 

Sogdiana Jizzak won 2–1 on aggregate.

References 

Football clubs in Iran
Association football clubs established in 1980
1980s establishments in Iran
Sport in Kerman Province
Women's football clubs in Iran